Eduard Zuber (22 July 1914 – 1990 ) was a Swiss footballer who played for FC Basel. He played as midfielder. 

Zuber joined Basel's first team in their 1933–34 season. His first game was the friendly game against Ferencvárosi TC, a match organised to celebrate the club's 40th anniversary. He played his domestic league debut for the club in the away game on 24 December 1933 against Grasshopper Club. He scored his first goal for his club on 23 September 1934 in the away game against Lausanne-Sport as Basel were defeated 3–5.

Between the years 1933 and 1939 Zuber played a total of 82 games for Basel scoring a total of five goals. 56 of these games were in the domestic league, four in the Swiss Cup and 22 were friendly games. He scored two goals in the domestic league, the other three were scored during the test games.

References

Sources
 Rotblau: Jahrbuch Saison 2017/2018. Publisher: FC Basel Marketing AG. 
 Die ersten 125 Jahre. Publisher: Josef Zindel im Friedrich Reinhardt Verlag, Basel. 
 Verein "Basler Fussballarchiv" Homepage

FC Basel players
Swiss men's footballers
Association football midfielders
1914 births
1990 deaths